Anouar Ait El Hadj (born 20 April 2002) is a Belgian professional footballer who plays as a midfielder for Genk in the Belgian First Division A.

Club career
He made his pro debut for Anderlecht in July 2019, coming on as a substitute against Oostende.

On 18 January 2023, Ait El Hadj signed a four-and-a-half-year contract with Genk.

International career
Born in Belgium, El Hadj is of Moroccan descent. He is a youth international for Belgium.

References

External links
 
 

2002 births
Belgian sportspeople of Moroccan descent
People from Arlon
Footballers from Luxembourg (Belgium)
Living people
Belgian footballers
Belgium youth international footballers
Belgium under-21 international footballers
Association football midfielders
R.S.C. Anderlecht players
RSCA Futures players
Jong Genk players
K.R.C. Genk players
Belgian Pro League players
Challenger Pro League players